Justice Rahila Hadea Cudjoe OFR (born 6 October 1948) is a retired Nigerian jurist and former Chief Judge of Kaduna State. She is the first female Chief judge in Kaduna State and served from 1996 to 2014. She is also first female Lawyer in North Western State as well as the first female Legal Draftsman in Kaduna State.

Early life and education 
Justice Rahila was born in Zaria, Kaduna State, in 1948. She attended Our Ladies High School, Kaduna and Government Girls College, Dala, Kano before gaining admission to study law at Ahmadu Bello University, Zaria. Rahila was then called to the Nigerian Bar in 1973.

Career
Rahila began her legal career as a State Counsel in the Kaduna State's Ministry of Justice. In 1979, she was appointed a Legal Draftsman of the Ministry of Justice, Kaduna and a Legislative Counsel to the Kaduna State House of Assembly. In 1983, she was appointed a Judge of the Kaduna State High Court. Under the administration of the former Governor Lawal Kaita of Kaduna State, Rahila was appointed a Chief Judge of the State. She was famous for heading the Zango-Kataf (Market), Kaduna State Riots Judicial Commission of Inquiry in 1992.

Memberships 

 Member, National Judicial Council
 Member, Nigerian Body of Benchers
 Member, Nigerian Bar Association

See also 
 List of first women lawyers and judges in Africa
 Chief Judge of Kaduna State

References 

20th-century Nigerian judges
Nigerian women judges
21st-century Nigerian judges
1948 births
Living people
Ahmadu Bello University alumni
People from Kaduna State
20th-century women judges
21st-century women judges